Sean Wainui (23 October 1995 – 18 October 2021) was a New Zealand rugby union player. He played on the wing (and occasionally centre) for provincial side Bay of Plenty, the Chiefs in Super Rugby, and for New Zealand's Māori international side the Māori All Blacks.

Early life
Wainui was a member of the Takapuna Grammar School 1st XV in 2011, 2012 and 2013. He was awarded North Harbour's 2013 Māori Colts Senior Player of the Year whilst still in school. Also an ex Takapuna Grammar Prefect and 1st XV Captain, Wainui represented New Zealand on the world stage after playing for the Champion New Zealand team in the Under 20 Rugby World Cup in Italy. The team played England for the title, winning 21–16.

Domestic career

Taranaki
Upon leaving school, Wainui was contracted by the Taranaki Rugby Football Union. In his first year out of school he was a part of Taranaki's 2014 national provincial championship squad. He was spotted by coach Colin Cooper and had signed with Taranaki at just 18-years-old after an impressive season, not only for his New Plymouth Old Boys club but for the Chiefs development side also. Wainui made his debut for Taranaki in the 2014 ITM Cup competition, coming on as a replacement against Waikato. In the following year, he recorded nine appearances, including 5 starts, and scored three tries for the province  in Super Rugby matches. Overall, between 2014 and 2020, Wainui made 49 appearances for Taranaki and scored 15 tries.

Crusaders
In 2015 he was signed by the Super Rugby franchise the Crusaders after impressing in the centre and wing position for Taranaki. Wainui made his debut for the Crusaders in round one of the 2016 Super Rugby competition, starting in the outside centre position against the Chiefs.

Chiefs
Prior to the 2018 Super Rugby season, he signed with the Chiefs. By the end of the 2021 Super Rugby season, he made 44 appearances for the club and has scored 18 tries. On 12 June 2021, in a 40-7 victory over the Waratahs during Super Rugby Trans-Tasman, he became the first player in Super Rugby history to score 5 tries in a single match.

Bay of Plenty
On 27 May 2021, Wainui announced on Instagram that he had signed with Bay of Plenty for the 2021 NPC.

International career
At the age of 19, Wainui was called up to the New Zealand U-20 team in 2015.

Although the then 19-year-old Wainui had only played several matches for Taranaki, Colin Cooper, the Māori All Blacks coach, selected him for the 2015 tour to Fiji, playing against the national side, and ending against the specially made New Zealand Barbarians. Overall he was capped 10 times.

Death 
Wainui died at about 7:50 am on 18 October 2021, five days before his 26th birthday, when the car that he was driving crashed into a tree at McLaren Falls Park near Tauranga. Wainui's tangihanga was held at Te Wainui marae in Whatatutu on 24 October 2021.

Before the test match between the New Zealand All Blacks and the United States at FedExField in Washington D.C. on 24 October 2021, a moment of silence was held in memory of Wainui's death. The United States team's captain, Bryce Campbell, presented the All Blacks a white No. 11 shirt with Wainui's name.

References

External links
 itsrugby.co.uk profile

1995 births
2021 deaths
New Zealand rugby union players
Rugby union wings
Rugby union centres
Taranaki rugby union players
Crusaders (rugby union) players
Rugby union players from the Gisborne Region
Road incident deaths in New Zealand
Bay of Plenty rugby union players
Māori All Blacks players
Chiefs (rugby union) players
People educated at Takapuna Grammar School
People educated at St Peter's College, Auckland